Darren Warham  is an English retired football (soccer) player who spent his professional career in the USL A-League.

Youth
Warham attended Lynn University where he was a 1996 Second Team and 1997 and 1998 First Team All American soccer player. He was three-time All South and the 1998 Sunshine State Conference Player of the Year. In 2006, Lynn University inducted Warham into its athletic Hall of Fame.

Professional
On 6 February 1999, the Dallas Burn selected Warham in the second round (twenty-fourth overall) of the 1999 MLS College Draft. Warham signed with the Raleigh Express of the USL A-League. The Charleston Battery purchased Warham's contract from the Express before the 2000 season. Warham spent the 2000 and 2001 seasons in Charleston. In 2002, Warham spent one season with the Hampton Roads Mariners. In 2006, he played two games as a player-assistant coach with the Virginia Beach Submariners

Coaching career 
2002–present

VA ODP Asst. Coach - Boys

VA ODP Head Coach- Boys

Region 1 ODP Asst. Coach- Boys

Virginia Rush Coach

Virginia Rush DOC- Boys Junior

Virginia Rush Asst. DOC-  US Academy

Virginia Rush Asst. DOC- ECNL

VA Premier League President

Virginia Beach Submariners Asst. Coach

Lonestar SC- Asst. DOC ENCL

Lonestar SC- DOC - ECNL

Lonestar SC- Asst. DOC- Boys TEPAL & Champions League

References

External links 
 2000 Charleston Battery: Darren Warham

1972 births
Living people
Charleston Battery players
English football managers
English footballers
English expatriate footballers
Association football defenders
Virginia Beach Mariners players
Lynn Fighting Knights men's soccer players
Raleigh Flyers players
Virginia Beach Piranhas players
A-League (1995–2004) players
USL League Two players
FC Dallas draft picks
Expatriate soccer players in the United States
English expatriate sportspeople in the United States
Player-coaches